The Pfeiffer Falcons are the athletic teams that represent Pfeiffer University, located in Misenheimer, North Carolina, in Division III intercollegiate sporting competitions of the National Collegiate Athletic Association (NCAA).

The school transitioned from Division II to the non-scholarship Division III, and joined the D-III USA South Athletic Conference starting in the 2017–18 school year. The Falcons previously competed in the NCAA Division II level, primarily competing in the Conference Carolinas from 1960–61 to 2016–17.

Varsity teams

List of teams

Men's sports (8)
 Baseball
 Basketball
 Cross country
 Golf
 Lacrosse
 Soccer
 Tennis
 Track & field

Women's sports (11)
 Basketball
 Cheer/Dance
 Cross country
 Golf
 Lacrosse
 Soccer
 Softball
 Swimming
 Tennis
 Track and field
 Volleyball

National championships
The 1981 Women's Field Hockey team became Pfeiffer's first team to win a National Championship.

Steven Armstrong of Edinburgh, Scotland became Pfeiffer's first individual National Champion in 1995 winning the NAIA National Golf Championship at Bailey Ranch, Tulsa, Oklahoma.

In 2009, varsity student-cyclist Joey Rosskopf won the overall Division II national road cycling championships.

For the first time in Pfeiffer men's soccer history the Falcons are National Champions, finishing the season a perfect 25–0. The Falcons dominated Cal Poly Pomona by a score of 4–0.  Pfeiffer's four goals was the second-most in an NCAA Division II championship game, and the Falcons recorded the first title game shutout since 2009.  The Falcons become the first undefeated champion in Division II men's soccer since Southern Connecticut State posted a 20–0 mark in 1999. The only other team to go unbeaten and untied was Lock Haven in 1980, who went 21–0.

Team

Individual

References

External links
 Official website